is a Japanese football player currently playing for Shimizu S-Pulse.

Club statistics
Updated to 23 February 2018.

References

External links

Profile at Shimizu S-Pulse
 

1982 births
Living people
Waseda University alumni
People from Ichihara, Chiba
Association football people from Chiba Prefecture
Japanese footballers
J1 League players
J2 League players
Kawasaki Frontale players
Montedio Yamagata players
Vissel Kobe players
V-Varen Nagasaki players
Shimizu S-Pulse players
Association football goalkeepers